The jerib or djerib is a traditional unit of land measurement in the Middle East and southwestern Asia. It is a unit of area used to measure land holdings (real property) in much the way that an acre or hectare are. Like most traditional units of measure, the jerib originally varied substantially from one location to another. However, in the twentieth century, the jerib has been regionally, if not uniformly defined. In many countries where it was traditionally used, it is equated with the hectare, for example in Turkey and Iran.

The word is probably derived from Arabic.

Historical
The royal enclosure at Isfahan in Iran was named Hazar Jerib for the expanse of irrigated acreage, namely 1000 jeribs.

Notes

See also
bigha, roughly equivalent land measure in Nepal and northern India

Units of area
Customary units of measurement
Metricated units